Markus Kallifatides (born 1972) is a Swedish politician, academic and member of the Riksdag, the national legislature. A member of the Social Democratic Party, he has represented Stockholm Municipality since September 2012.

Kallifatides studied business administration, economics, French, philosophy and political science at the University of Linköping, and psychology at the University of Stockholm. He has a Master of Science degree from the Stockholm School of Economics (HHS). He has taught at HHS since graduating in 1995 and is currently an associate professor in the Department of Management and Organization.

References

1972 births
Living people
Members of the Riksdag 2022–2026
Members of the Riksdag from the Social Democrats
People from Stockholm
Stockholm School of Economics alumni
Academic staff of the Stockholm School of Economics
Swedish scholars and academics